The arrondissement of Briey is an arrondissement of France in the Meurthe-et-Moselle department in the Grand Est region. It has 128 communes.

Composition

The communes of the arrondissement of Briey, and their INSEE codes, are:

 Abbéville-lès-Conflans (54002)
 Affléville (54004)
 Allamont (54009)
 Allondrelle-la-Malmaison (54011)
 Anderny (54015)
 Anoux (54018)
 Auboué (54028)
 Audun-le-Roman (54029)
 Avillers (54033)
 Avril (54036)
 Les Baroches (54048)
 Baslieux (54049)
 Batilly (54051)
 Bazailles (54056)
 Béchamps (54058)
 Bettainvillers (54066)
 Beuveille (54067)
 Beuvillers (54069)
 Boismont (54081)
 Boncourt (54082)
 Brainville (54093)
 Bréhain-la-Ville (54096)
 Bruville (54103)
 Chambley-Bussières (54112)
 Charency-Vezin (54118)
 Chenières (54127)
 Colmey (54134)
 Conflans-en-Jarnisy (54136)
 Cons-la-Grandville (54137)
 Cosnes-et-Romain (54138)
 Crusnes (54149)
 Cutry (54151)
 Dampvitoux (54153)
 Domprix (54169)
 Doncourt-lès-Conflans (54171)
 Doncourt-lès-Longuyon (54172)
 Épiez-sur-Chiers (54178)
 Errouville (54181)
 Fillières (54194)
 Fléville-Lixières (54198)
 Fresnois-la-Montagne (54212)
 Friauville (54213)
 Giraumont (54227)
 Gondrecourt-Aix (54231)
 Gorcy (54234)
 Grand-Failly (54236)
 Hagéville (54244)
 Han-devant-Pierrepont (54602)
 Hannonville-Suzémont (54249)
 Hatrize (54253)
 Haucourt-Moulaine (54254)
 Herserange (54261)
 Homécourt (54263)
 Hussigny-Godbrange (54270)
 Jarny (54273)
 Jeandelize (54277)
 Jœuf (54280)
 Joppécourt (54282)
 Jouaville (54283)
 Joudreville (54284)
 Labry (54286)
 Laix (54290)
 Landres (54295)
 Lantéfontaine (54302)
 Lexy (54314)
 Longlaville (54321)
 Longuyon (54322)
 Longwy (54323)
 Lubey (54326)
 Mairy-Mainville (54334)
 Malavillers (54337)
 Mars-la-Tour (54353)
 Mercy-le-Bas (54362)
 Mercy-le-Haut (54363)
 Mexy (54367)
 Moineville (54371)
 Mont-Bonvillers (54084)
 Montigny-sur-Chiers (54378)
 Mont-Saint-Martin (54382)
 Morfontaine (54385)
 Mouaville (54389)
 Moutiers (54391)
 Murville (54394)
 Norroy-le-Sec (54402)
 Olley (54408)
 Onville (54410)
 Othe (54412)
 Ozerailles (54413)
 Petit-Failly (54420)
 Piennes (54425)
 Pierrepont (54428)
 Preutin-Higny (54436)
 Puxe (54440)
 Puxieux (54441)
 Réhon (54451)
 Saint-Ail (54469)
 Saint-Jean-lès-Longuyon (54476)
 Saint-Julien-lès-Gorze (54477)
 Saint-Marcel (54478)
 Saint-Pancré (54485)
 Saint-Supplet (54489)
 Sancy (54491)
 Saulnes (54493)
 Serrouville (54504)
 Sponville (54511)
 Tellancourt (54514)
 Thil (54521)
 Thumeréville (54524)
 Tiercelet (54525)
 Trieux (54533)
 Tronville (54535)
 Tucquegnieux (54536)
 Ugny (54537)
 Val de Briey (54099)
 Valleroy (54542)
 Ville-au-Montois (54568)
 Villecey-sur-Mad (54570)
 Ville-Houdlémont (54572)
 Villers-la-Chèvre (54574)
 Villers-la-Montagne (54575)
 Villers-le-Rond (54576)
 Villerupt (54580)
 Ville-sur-Yron (54581)
 Villette (54582)
 Viviers-sur-Chiers (54590)
 Waville (54593)
 Xivry-Circourt (54598)
 Xonville (54599)

History

The arrondissement of Briey was created as part of the department Moselle in 1800. Since 1871 it has been a part of the department Meurthe-et-Moselle.

As a result of the reorganisation of the cantons of France which came into effect in 2015, the borders of the cantons are no longer related to the borders of the arrondissements. The cantons of the arrondissement of Briey were, as of January 2015:

 Audun-le-Roman
 Briey
 Chambley-Bussières
 Conflans-en-Jarnisy
 Herserange
 Homécourt
 Longuyon
 Longwy
 Mont-Saint-Martin
 Villerupt

References

Briey